Dağpazarı is a village in the Mut district of Mersin Province, Turkey

Geography 
Dağpazarı is a part of Mut district of Mersin Province. The population of the village was 287 as of 2012. But Dağpazarı is also a yayla (resort) of Mut residents and in summers the population may increase.

History 
Dağpazarı is an old village. During Byzantine era its name was Coropissus. It was on the road connecting Mut to Central Anatolia. There are ruins of a church as well as rock tombs around the village. After Seljukids and Crusaders, Dağpazarı was captured by the Karamanids in the 13th century and by the Ottoman Empire in the 15th century. After the Russo-Turkish War (1877–1878), during which most of the Ottoman  territories in Europe were lost,  Turks from Hacıoğlu Pazarcık (modern Dobrich in Bulgaria) migrated to Anatolia to find new homes and 18 families of these people were settled in Dağpazarı to start a new phase in village history.

Economy 
After irrigation problems were solved in 1950s, the village became an important fruit producer. Main products are apple and grapes.

In May 2012, a wind farm consısting of 13 wind turbines with a total installed capacity of 39 MW was constructed.

References 

Villages in Mut District